Iola is a village in Clay County, Illinois, United States. The population was 98 at the 2020 census.

Geography
Iola is located in northwestern Clay County at  (38.833717, -88.627785).

Demographics

As of the 2020 census there were 98 people, 34 households, and 28 families residing in the village. The racial makeup of the village was 94.90% White, 2.04% from other races, and 3.06% from two or more races. No residents reported an ethnicity of Hispanic or Latino.

There were 34 households, out of which 76.47% had children under the age of 18 living with them, 70.59% were married couples living together, 0.00% had a female householder with no husband present, and 17.65% were non-families. 8.82% of all households were made up of individuals, and 5.88% had someone living alone who was 65 years of age or older. The average household size was 2.86 and the average family size was 2.68.

The village's age distribution consisted of 29.7% under the age of 18, 8.8% from 18 to 24, 34.1% from 25 to 44, 19.8% from 45 to 64, and 7.7% who were 65 years of age or older. The median age was 27.9 years. For every 100 females, there were 133.3 males. For every 100 females age 18 and over, there were 120.7 males.

The median income for a household in the village was $50,000, and the median income for a family was $55,500. Males had a median income of $43,750 versus $17,083 for females. The per capita income for the village was $19,992. About 7.1% of families and 11.1% of the population were below the poverty line, including 3.8% of those under age 18 and 14.3% of those age 65 or over.

References

Villages in Clay County, Illinois
Villages in Illinois